The women's team sabre event at the 2020 Summer Olympics took place on 31 July 2021 at the Makuhari Messe. 27 fencers (9 teams of 3) from 9 nations are expected to compete.

Background
This will be the 3rd appearance of the event. It was introduced in 2008, at which point the team events began to be rotated off the schedule, with only two of the three weapons for each of the men's and women's categories. The women's team sabre rotated off in 2012 and back on in 2016. The 2020 Games ended the rotation system, with all weapons having team events.

The reigning Olympic champion is Russia (Yekaterina Dyachenko, Yuliya Gavrilova, Yana Egorian, and Sofya Velikaya). Russia is also the reigning World Champion (Egorian, Olga Nikitina, Sofia Pozdniakova, and Velikaya). A preview from Olympics.com identified Russia as a recently powerful contender, joining historically strong nations Italy, France, and Hungary.

Qualification

A National Olympic Committee (NOC) could enter a team of 3 fencers in the women's team sabre. These fencers also automatically qualified for the individual event.

There are 8 dedicated quota spots for women's team sabre. They are allocated as through the world team ranking list of 5 April 2021. The top 4 spots, regardless of geographic zone, qualify (ROC, Italy, France, and South Korea). The next four spots are allocated to separate geographic zones, as long as an NOC from that zone is in the top 16. These places went to China (Asia/Oceania), the United States (Americas), Tunisia (Africa), and Hungary (Europe).

Additionally, there are 8 host/invitational spots that can be spread throughout the various fencing events. Japan qualified one women's sabre fencer through normal individual qualification and used two host quota places to complete a women's sabre team.

The COVID-19 pandemic delayed many of the events for qualifying for fencing, moving the close of the rankings period back to April 5, 2021 rather than the original April 4, 2020.

Competition format
The 2020 tournament is a single-elimination tournament, with classification matches for all places. Each match features the three fencers on each team competing in a round-robin, with 9 three-minute bouts to 5 points; the winning team is the one that reaches 45 total points first or is leading after the end of the nine bouts. Standard sabre rules regarding target area, striking, and priority are used.

Schedule
The competition is held over a single day, Saturday, 31 July. The first session runs from 10 a.m. to approximately 3:20 p.m. (when all matches except the bronze and gold medal finals are expected to conclude), after which there is a break until 6:30 p.m. before the medal bouts are held.

All times are Japan Standard Time (UTC+9)

Results

5–8th place classification

Final classification

References

External links
Draw 

Women's team sabre
Women's events at the 2020 Summer Olympics
2021 in women's fencing